Phototendering is the process by which organic fibres and textiles lose strength and flexibility as a result of exposure to sunlight. It is the ultraviolet component of the sun's spectrum which affects fibres, causing chain degradation and hence loss of strength. Fading of colours is a common problem in phototendering.

UV Degradation
The rate of deterioration is also affected by pigments and dyes present in the textiles. Pigments themselves can also be affected, generally fading after exposure to both UVA and UVB radiation. Great care is needed to preserve museum artefacts from the harmful effects such as ancient textiles, of UV light, which can also be present in fluorescent lamps. Paintings such as watercolours need protection from sunlight so that the original colours are preserved. 

Many synthetic polymers are also degraded by UV light with polypropylene especially susceptible. As a result, UV stabilisers are added to many thermoplastics. Carbon black is also effective in protecting products against UV degradation.

See also
 Polymer degradation
 Textiles
 Ultraviolet
 UV degradation
 UV Stabilizers in plastics

External links
 Survival of Old Textiles
 Patent for Protection of Fibres from Phototendering

Mechanical failure